A by-election was held for the New South Wales Legislative Assembly seat of Ku-ring-gai on 13 September 1980. It was triggered by the resignation of John Maddison.

By-elections for the seats of Bankstown and Murray were held on the same day.

Dates

Results 
				

John Maddison resigned. did not nominate a candidate.

See also
Electoral results for the district of Ku-ring-gai
List of New South Wales state by-elections

Notes

References 

1980 elections in Australia
New South Wales state by-elections
1980s in New South Wales